Pterallastes thoracicus  (Loew 1863), the Goldenback Fly, is an uncommon species of syrphid fly observed across central and eastern areas of the United States. Hoverflies can remain nearly motionless in flight while many are mimics of bees. The adults are also known as flower flies for they are commonly found on flowers, from which they get both energy-giving nectar and protein-rich pollen. The larvae are unknown.

Distribution
United States.

References

Eristalinae
Diptera of North America
Insects described in 1863
Taxa named by Hermann Loew